The Mayor of Pasig is the chief executive of the government of Pasig in  Metro Manila, Philippines. The mayor leads the city's departments in executing ordinances and delivering public services. The mayorship is a three-year term and each mayor is restricted to three consecutive terms, totaling nine years, although a mayor can be elected again after an interruption of one term.

The current mayor of Pasig is Vico Sotto.

List 

Reference:

Vice Mayor of Pasig 
The Vice Mayor is the second-highest official of the city. The vice mayor is elected via popular vote; although most mayoral candidates have running mates, the vice mayor is elected separately from the mayor. This can result in the mayor and the vice mayor coming from different political parties.

The Vice Mayor is the presiding officer of the Pasig City Council, although he can only vote as the tiebreaker. When a mayor is removed from office, the vice mayor becomes the mayor until the scheduled next election. Robert Jaworski Jr. assumed the post on June 30, 2022.

List

References 

Pasig
Pasig
Mayors of Pasig